Conveyance (foaled 2007 in Kentucky) is a retired American Thoroughbred racehorse. He is by leading stallion Indian Charlie and out of the broodmare Emptythetill, herself a daughter of American Horse of the Year Holy Bull.  He was bred by Gulf Coast Farms LLC and Consigned by Taylor Made Sales Agency, agent, Conveyance was bought for $240,000 by Legends Racing.

Owned by Zabeel Racing International, LLC, he was trained by Bob Baffert. Conveyance has had five starts prior to April 2010. He won his first four races and placed in the fifth one.

Conveyance broke his maiden by  lengths at Santa Anita on Oct. 31 and followed that with a seven-length romp at Hollywood Park on Nov. 25.

Conveyance began his 3 year old season with a win in January's San Rafael Stakes at Santa Anita. He followed that win with a win in the Southwest Stakes.  Baffert Bob Baffert has made Conveyance his No. 3 Kentucky Derby prospect following his win in the Southwest Stakes.

In March, Baffert said he will likely make his next start March 28 in the Grade 3 $800,000 Sunland Derby, the second-richest of all the Derby preps.

On March 28, Endorsement shocked Conveyance in Sunland Derby (AP). Endorsement pulled ahead of heavy favorite Conveyance on the final stretch for an upset victory.

Conveyance qualified for the Kentucky Derby and on April 29 drew post #12.  The Kentucky Derby was run on May 1, 2010 and is the first jewel of the Triple Crown. He finished 15th in a field of 20 runners.

References

 Conveyance pedigree and partial racing stats

2007 racehorse births
Thoroughbred family 8-g
Racehorses bred in Virginia
Racehorses trained in the United States